Cokeromyces recurvatus is a pathogenic fungus. Described as a new species in 1950, it was isolated from rabbit dung collected in Illinois.

The genus name of Anzia is in honour of William Chambers Coker (1872 – 1953), was an American botanist and mycologist.

The genus was circumscribed by Leland Shanor in Mycologia Vol.42 (Issue 2) on page 272 in 1950.

It appears similar to Coccidioides immitis.

References

Zygomycota
Fungi described in 1950
Fungi of North America